Three Bridges depot is an Electric Traction Depot located in Three Bridges, West Sussex, England. The depot is about 1.5 km south of Three Bridges railway station, on either side of the Brighton Main Line.

History 
Located in the 'fork' between the Brighton Main Line (L&BR 1841), the Arun Valley line (LB&SCR 1848), and the now-closed Three Bridges–Tunbridge Wells line (EGR 1855), the site had historically been used for railway use, having not been built on until railway developments; by 1910 sidings had been built east of the Brighton Main Line, as well as an engine shed and turntable adjacent west of the site; in 2008 the western development area comprised underused sidings and hardstanding with the site east of the mainline including operation sidings, as well as offices; tenants included English Welsh & Scottish Railway, BAM Nuttall, Colas Rail and Balfour Beatty.

Thameslink depot 
As part of the Thameslink Programme, it was decided that a large fleet of new trains, which were later named the Class 700, would be introduced on the Thameslink network.

In 2008, the Department for Transport commissioned a study into the location of depots for the future Thameslink rolling stock: Network Rail preferred two depots based on an expectation that at times the central area of the Thameslink route would be closed for maintenance outside commercial operational hours, with no workable alternative electrified routes available. A single-depot solution was also investigated, but no suitably large sites were identified for such a facility. Sites were considered at: Wellingborough; Hornsey; Cricklewood; Selhurst; Three Bridges; and Tonbridge. By late 2008, the sites had been narrowed to Hornsey, Three Bridges and Tonbridge; finally Hornsey and Three Bridges were selected as a two-depot solution.

In 2009, Arup acting on behalf of Network Rail submitted a planning application for a rolling-stock depot south of Three Bridges railway station on a  site owned by Network Rail, with facilities on either side of the Brighton Main Line. Site offices and warehousing were to be in a  three-storey building northwest of the main shed.

Planning permission for the development was granted in November 2009, but in December the associated Hornsey depot application was blocked by the Secretary of State for Communities and Local Government John Denham; Network Rail submitted revised plans for both sites in 2011, with a smaller Hornsey scheme and an expanded Three Bridges scheme.

In the same period as the new application, Network Rail submitted plans for a large railway operation and signalling centre to be built adjacent to the Three Bridges depot (see Three Bridges railway station#Three Bridges rail operating centre).

In mid-2013, VolkerFitzpatrick was awarded the approximately £150 million contract to build the two depots.

The depot was officially opened by Patrick McLoughlin (MP) in October 2015. One road had two bogie drops, and a road was fitted with 25 kV AC electrification for static tests though the main building was unelectrified (third rail). Wheel lathes and carriage washes were outside the MFB.

Allocation 
As of 2016, the depot's allocation consists of Class 700 EMUs.

Notes

References

Sources 
 
 

Railway depots in England
Buildings and structures in Crawley
Transport in Crawley
Rail transport in West Sussex